Ardian Ilmi Ismajli (born 30 September 1996) is a professional footballer who plays as a defender for  club Empoli. Born in Kosovo, he represents the Albania national team.

Club career

Early career
Ismajli went through the ranks of First Football League of Kosovo side 2 Korriku from Pristina, Kosovo. He made his senior debut in the second half of the 2013–14 season and in mid-2015, Ismajli went on a one season loan to Football Superleague of Kosovo side Prishtina.

Hajduk Split
In February 2016, Ismajli signed a three and a half year scholarship contract with Croatian First Football League side Hajduk Split after a trial. Ismajli initially played for Hajduk Split II in the 3. HNL. On 14 May 2016, he made his senior debut for Hajduk against Zagreb in the Croatian First Football League and playing the full 90 minutes as a central defender in a 3–2 win. Ismajli was booked in the 48th minute.

In the 2016–17 season, Ismajli became a regular player under coach Marijan Pušnik. In the first match of the season, a 2016–17 UEFA Europa League second qualifying round match against Politehnica Iași in Romania, he was included in the match day squad, but did not participate in the match. Ismajli started the next match in a 2–0 league win over newly-promoted Cibalia and playing as right back. On 18 August 2016, he made his UEFA Europa League debut in a 2–1 defeat against Maccabi Tel Aviv at Netanya Stadium in the playoff round after being named in the starting line-up. On 21 August 2016, Ismajli scored his first goal for Hajduk in a 4–2 defeat against Rijeka at Poljud Stadium.

Spezia Calcio
In September 2020, Ismajli signed a three-year deal with Italian club Spezia. He joined the club ahead of their first ever season in the Serie A.

International career

Kosovo

Youth
On 5 June 2017, Ismajli received a call-up from Kosovo U21 for a 2019 UEFA European Under-21 Championship qualification match against Norway U21 and made his debut after being named in the starting line-up.

Senior
On 2 October 2016, Ismajli received a call-up from Kosovo for a 2018 FIFA World Cup qualification matches against Croatia and Ukraine, but a day before joining with national team, he injured during derby match between Dinamo Zagreb and Hajduk Split. On 29 May 2018, Ismajli made his debut with Kosovo in friendly match against Albania after being named in the starting line-up.

Albania
Ismajli received the Albanian citizenship on 26 October 2018. On 7 November 2018, Ismajli received a call-up from Albania for the 2018–19 UEFA Nations League match against Scotland and friendly match against Wales.

Career statistics

Club

International

Scores and results list Albania's goal tally first, score column indicates score after each Ismajli goal.

References

External links

1996 births
Living people
Sportspeople from Podujevo
Kosovo Albanians
Association football defenders
Kosovan footballers
Kosovo international footballers
Kosovo youth international footballers
Kosovo under-21 international footballers
Albanian footballers
Albania international footballers
Dual internationalists (football)
Football Superleague of Kosovo players
FC Prishtina players
Croatian Football League players
Serie A players
HNK Hajduk Split players
Spezia Calcio players
Empoli F.C. players
Kosovan expatriate footballers
Expatriate footballers in Croatia
Kosovan expatriate sportspeople in Croatia
Albanian expatriate footballers
Albanian expatriate sportspeople in Croatia
Expatriate footballers in Italy
Kosovan expatriate sportspeople in Italy
Albanian expatriate sportspeople in Italy